Methylibium petroleiphilum is a species of methyl tert-butyl ether-degrading methylotroph, the type species of its genus. It is a Gram-negative, rod-shaped, motile, non-pigmented, facultative aerobe, with type strain PM1T (=ATCC BAA-1232T =LMG 22953T).

References

Further reading

External links

LPSN
Type strain of Methylibium petroleiphilum at BacDive -  the Bacterial Diversity Metadatabase

Burkholderiales
Bacteria described in 2006